Grove Park is a railway station in southeast London, England. It is located on Baring Road (the A2212) within Travelcard Zone 4, and serves the areas of Grove Park and Downham in the London Borough of Lewisham.

It serves as an interchange between local South Eastern Main Line services & the Bromley North Line shuttle. Prior to 1952 there was also a connection to trams.

The station was opened in 1871.

Platforms 
Currently there are five platforms. Platform 1 serves Bromley North branch line, which is detached from the rest of the station, while platforms 2 to 5 are on the South Eastern Main Line which runs from Charing Cross to Hastings. The adjacent stations are Elmstead Woods to the south, Hither Green to the north, and Sundridge Park on the Bromley North branch line.

There are regular services to London Charing Cross and London Cannon Street.

Services 

The typical off-peak service in trains per hour is:
 2 tph to London Cannon Street (all stations except Lewisham)
 2 tph to 

On Sundays, the station is served by a half-hourly service between Sevenoaks and London Charing Cross via Lewisham, with no service to Bromley North.

Connections
London Buses routes 124, 126, 136, 181, 261, 284, 273 and 638 and night route N136 serve the station.

References

External links 

Railway stations in the London Borough of Lewisham
DfT Category C2 stations
Former South Eastern Railway (UK) stations
Railway stations in Great Britain opened in 1871
Railway stations served by Southeastern
Grove Park, Lewisham